Enrique Verduga (born 19 January 1964) is an Ecuadorian footballer. He played in twelve matches for the Ecuador national football team from 1987 to 1995. He was also part of Ecuador's squad for the 1989 Copa América tournament.

References

External links
 

1964 births
Living people
Ecuadorian footballers
Ecuador international footballers
Association football midfielders
C.S. Emelec footballers
L.D.U. Portoviejo footballers